Phu Chi Fa, also Phu Chee Fah, is a mountain area and national forest park in Thailand. 
It is located at the northeastern end of the Phi Pan Nam Range, 12 km to the southwest of Doi Pha Tang at the eastern edge of Tap Tao in Thoeng District, Chiang Rai Province. 

The cliff is part of an elevated area, the Doi Pha Mon sub-range, that rises near the border with Laos sloping towards the Mekong River. The highest point of the ridge is 1628 m high Doi Pha Mon.

With views over the surrounding mountains, it is one of the famous tourist attractions of the Thai highlands near Chiang Rai. Tourists visit the mountain especially at dawn in order to catch a glimpse of the "sea of mist", the view of the fog-surrounded hills, with heights ranging between 1,200 and 1,600 m  to the east of the mountain.

The weather on Phu Chi Fa is cool, averaging around 20° C. It has three seasons: hot, rainy, and cool, influenced by the tropical monsoon.

Fauna
Phu Chi Fa is home to a number of mammals, include barking deer, wild boar, palm civets. Birds include canaries, pheasants, and magpies.

See also
Thai highlands
List of mountains in Thailand

References

External links

Phu Chi Fa, Thailand Tourism Authority
Phu Chi Fa, Thailand Department of National Parks

Mountains of Thailand
Geography of Chiang Rai province
Forest parks of Thailand
Tourist attractions in Chiang Rai province
Phi Pan Nam Range
Laos–Thailand border